Lawrence "Bubb" Korver is a retired American football coach. He served as the head coach at Northwestern College in Orange City, Iowa from 1967 to 1994, compiling a record of 212–77–6. Korver led Northwestern to two NAIA Division II Football National Championships, in 1973 and 1983. He was inducted into the NAIA Hall of Fame in 1990.

A native of Orange City, attended Northwestern when it was a junior college and then South Dakota State University. He played football at both schools. Korver coached at Walnut Grove High School in Walnut Grove, Minnesota and Maurice-Orange City High School in his hometown. He was the head football coach for five seasons, from 1962 to 1966, at Luverne High School in Luverne, Minnesota, leading his teams to record of 21–20–1.

Head coaching record

College

References

Year of birth missing (living people)
Living people
American football halfbacks
Northwestern Red Raiders football coaches
Northwestern Red Raiders football players
South Dakota State Jackrabbits football players
South Dakota State Jackrabbits men's basketball players
High school football coaches in Iowa
High school football coaches in Minnesota
Junior college football players in the United States
People from Orange City, Iowa
Coaches of American football from Iowa
Players of American football from Iowa
Basketball players from Iowa